Collagen alpha-1(XI) chain is a protein that in humans is encoded by the COL11A1 gene.

Function 

The COL11A1 gene encodes one of the two alpha chains of type XI collagen, a minor fibrillar collagen. Type XI collagen is a heterotrimer but the third alpha chain is a post-translationally modified alpha 1 type II chain. Three transcript variants encoding different isoforms have been identified for this gene.

Clinical significance 

Mutations in this gene are associated with type II Stickler syndrome and with Marshall syndrome.

Stickler syndrome, type II is an autosomal dominant condition caused by a mutation in the COL11A1 gene. Features of Stickler syndrome type II include: sensorineural hearing loss, facial features (flat facial profile, anteverted nares, micrognathia), cleft palate, visual disturbances (type 2 vitreous anomaly, childhood-onset myopia, glaucoma, cataracts and retinal detachment), spondyloepiphyseal dysplasia, and arthropathy.

References

External links
  GeneReviews/NCBI/NIH/UW entry on Stickler Syndrome

Further reading